Synempora andesae is a species of moth belonging to the family Neopseustidae. It was described by Davis & Nielsen in 1980. It is known from Argentina and Chile.

References

Neopseustidae